Leiodon cutcutia, the ocellated pufferfish, is a species of pufferfish native to southern Asia from India to the Malay Archipelago where it is found in various bodies of fresh and brackish waters.  This species grows to a length of  TL.  It is currently the only known member of its genus, but it was included in Tetraodon until 2013.

References

Tetraodontidae
Taxa named by Francis Buchanan-Hamilton
Fish described in 1822